This is a list of famous people from the Israeli city of Haifa.

Academia and research

Rachel Adato (gynecologist)
Dan Bar-On (psychologist)
Nitza Ben-Dov (Literature)
Edmond Bonan (mathematician)
Aaron Ciechanover (biologist; 2004 Nobel Prize, Chemistry)
David Deutsch (physicist)
Dahlia Gredinger (chemist)
 Yehuda Hayuth (geography; President of the University of Haifa)
Avram Hershko (biochemist, 2004 Nobel Prize, Chemistry)
 Amnon Pazy (1936–2006), mathematician; President of the Hebrew University of Jerusalem
Ilan Pappé (historian)

Arts and entertainment

Abed Abdi (painter, sculptor)
Chava Alberstein (singer)
Moran Atias (model)
Ralph Bakshi (animator and director)
Mike Brant (pop star)
David Broza (musician)
Delilah (fictional character from John Rain series)
Ari Folman (film director)
Amos Gitai (film director)
Ivry Gitlis (violinist)
Carine Goren (pastry chef, cookbook author, and television baking show host)
Tamara Musakhanova, sculptor and ceramist
Infected Mushroom (electronic music duo)
Avi Lerner (movie executive)
Dani Litani (musician and actor)
Shiri Maimon (singer)
Izidore Musallam (film director)
Vince Offer (entertainer and pitchman)
Eytan Pessen (voice teacher, pianist and opera director)
Yehuda Poliker (singer)
Nasreen Qadri (singer)
Odeya Rush (actress)
Daniel Salomon (musician)
Rinat Shaham (opera singer)
Simon Shaheen (musician-Oud player)
Gene Simmons (musician, bassist of Kiss)
Shirin Sahba (painter, artist)
Hillel Slovak (musician, original guitarist of the Red Hot Chili Peppers)
Drew Tal (Dror Toledano, photographer and visual artist)
David Tartakover (artist)
Dudu Topaz (1946–2009) (TV and radio personality, comedian, and author)
Nilli Willis (adult film star)
Noam Zylberman (actor)
Talia Lewenthal (Miss Israel 1996)
Miri Zamir (Miss Israel 1968)
Dorit Jellinek (Miss Israel 1978)
Ronit Rinat (Miss Israel 1964)

Education
Dr. Arthur Biram (educator)

Engineering and technology
Moshe Safdie (architect)
Johny Srouji (computer scientist)

Fashion
Lea Gottlieb (founder and fashion designer of Gottex)

Journalism and media
Ari Libsker (journalist)
Rula Jebreal (Palestinian-Italian journalist)

Literature
Emile Habibi (author)
Sami Michael (author)
Galila Ron-Feder Amit (author)
Alex Aronson (author, teacher)

Military and security
Ze'ev Almog (11th Commander of the Israeli Sea Corps)
Yohai Ben-Nun (6th Commander of the Israeli Sea Corps) 
Yaakov Dori (1st Chief of Staff of the Israel Defense Forces)
Haim Laskov (5th Chief of Staff of the Israel Defense Forces and 4th Commander of the Israeli Air Force)
Ehud Shani (general)
Paul Shulman (2nd Commander of the Israeli Sea Corps)
Shmuel Tankus (5th Commander of the Israeli Sea Corps, Palmach hero)
Benjamin Telem (9th Commander of the Israeli Sea Corps)

Medicine and Health Care
 Dr. Ora Golan, Founder of The Ora Golan Center for Functional Medicine

Politics and government
Rachel Adato (politician)
Naftali Bennett (politician)
Moshe Feiglin (politician)
 Noah Gal Gendler (ambassador)
Emile Habibi (Christian Communist writer and politician)
Zevulun Hammer (politician)
Khaled al-Hassan (Palestinian politician)
Hani al-Hassan (Palestinian politician)
Moshe Kahlon (politician)
Leila Khaled (Palestinian politician)
Uzi Landau (politician)
Uri Lupolianski (mayor of Jerusalem)
Jabra Nicola (Palestinian Trotskyist leader)
 Boaz Rodkin (ambassador)
Dan Tichon (politician)
Emile Toma (politician)
Moti Yogev (politician)

Religion
Yona Metzger

Sports

Ruth Abeles (born 1942), Olympic gymnast
Nina Amir (born 1999), Olympic sports sailor
Reuven Atar, footballer
Tal Banin, footballer
Orr Barouch (born 1991), footballer
Arik Benado, footballer
Miron Bleiberg, football coach
Gil Cohen (born 1992), Olympic sports sailor
Jonathan Erlich (born 1977), tennis player
 Anastasia Gorbenko (born 2003), swimmer
Ayala Hetzroni (born 1938), Olympic shotputter
Yaniv Katan, association football player
Jonatan Kopelev (born 1991), swimmer
Ilana Kratysh, freestyle wrestler
Eyal Levin (born 1986), Olympic sports sailor
Eduard Meron (born 1938), Olympic weightlifter
 Lior Mor (born 1976), tennis player
 Ran Nakash (born 1978), cruiserweight boxer
Noam Okun (born 1978), tennis player
Tomer Or (born 1978), fencer
Guy Parselany (born 1978), professional basketball player
Shahar Perkiss (born 1962), tennis player
Lior Refaelov, footballer
Ronny Rosenthal (born 1963), footballer
Shem-Tov Sabag (born 1959), Olympic marathoner
Idan Tal (born 1975), footballer 
 Bar Timor (born 1992), basketball player
Eithan Urbach (born 1977), swimmer
Yochanan Vollach, footballer, president of Maccabi Haifa
 Yiftach Ziv (born 1995), basketball player

Other
Gilla Gerzon, Director, Haifa USO
Amir Gal-Or,  businessman
Eival Gilady, CEO of the Portland Trust
Hannah Safran, feminist, activist and researcher
David Sambar, international investment banker, financial advisor and investor
Eyal Weizman, intellectual and architect

References

 
People
Haifa